The Council of Asian Liberals and Democrats (CALD) is a regional organization of liberal democratic  political parties in Asia.

Background
The Council was created on 15 October 1993, in a meeting in Taipei, Taiwan. There are nine member parties, an associate member, and one party with observer status. Currently, many democrats in Asia have a relationship with CALD. CALD has also opened its membership to like-minded individuals, and regularly engages with non-member political parties from Japan and South Korea with which it shares the same democratic values. The Democratic Party of Japan is one of the examples. On the other hand, for the convenience of particular members, they also accept individual members like the situation in Hong Kong. The Democratic Party of Hong Kong is represented in CALD by Martin Lee and Sin Chung Kai. The third individual member of the CALD was Indonesia's ex-President Abdurrahman Wahid (1940–2009). Aung San Suu Kyi and Corazon Aquino (1933-2009) are honorary members of CALD.

Full members

Observer parties

References

External links
 Council of Asian Liberals and Democrats official site

International liberal organizations
Political parties established in 1993
1993 establishments in Taiwan